Sataporn Kantasa-ard (born 7 July 1950) is a former Thai cyclist. He competed in the individual road race and team time trial events at the 1972 Summer Olympics.

References

External links
 

1950 births
Living people
Sataporn Kantasa-ard
Sataporn Kantasa-ard
Cyclists at the 1972 Summer Olympics
Place of birth missing (living people)
Cyclists at the 1970 Asian Games
Sataporn Kantasa-ard
Sataporn Kantasa-ard